Bernard (Bernhard) is a French and West Germanic masculine given name. It is also a surname.

The name is attested from at least the 9th century. West Germanic Bernhard is composed from the two elements bern "bear" and hard "brave, hardy". Its native Old English reflex was Beornheard, which was replaced by the French form Bernard that was brought to England after the Norman Conquest. The name Bernhard was notably popular among Old Frisian speakers. Its wider use was popularized due to Saint Bernhard of Clairvaux (canonized in 1174). Bernard is the second most common surname in France.

Geographical distribution
As of 2014, 42.2% of all known bearers of the surname Bernard were residents of France (frequency 1:392), 12.5% of the United States (1:7,203), 7.0% of Haiti (1:382), 6.6% of Tanzania (1:1,961), 4.8% of Canada (1:1,896), 3.6% of Nigeria (1:12,221), 2.7% of Burundi (1:894), 1.9% of Belgium (1:1,500), 1.6% of Rwanda (1:1,745), 1.2% of Germany (1:16,397), 1.2% of Jamaica (1:595), 1.1% of Ghana (1:6,179), 1.0% of England (1:13,691) and 1.0% of Madagascar (1:6,098).

In France, the frequency of the surname was higher than national average (1:392) in the following regions:
 1. Collectivity of Saint Martin (1:60)
 2. Saint Barthélemy (1:189)
 3. Bourgogne-Franche-Comté (1:260)
 4. Nouvelle-Aquitaine (1:283)
 5. Auvergne-Rhône-Alpes (1:296)
 6. Brittany (1:333)
 7. Pays de la Loire (1:336)
 8. Provence-Alpes-Côte d'Azur (1:348)
 9. Hauts-de-France (1:391)

List of people with the name
The following people and items share the name Bernard.

Given name

Catholic saints
Saint Bernard: see Saint Bernard (disambiguation)#People

Medieval
 Bernard, son of Charles Martel (c.720-787), Abbot of St. Quentin
 Bernard (bishop of Carlisle) (died 1214), 13th-century Catholic bishop
 Bernard (bishop of Gaeta) (died 1047)
 Bernard (bishop of St Davids) (1115–1148)
 Bernard (son of Charles the Fat) (died 891 or 892), Duke of Alemannia
 Bernard Gui (c. 1260–1331), 14th century inquisitor
 Bernard of Calvo (Bernat Calbó), 13th-century saint and Bishop of Vich
 Bernard of Carinola (died 1109), 12th-century saint and Bishop of Carinola
 Bernard of Cluny, 12th-century Benedictine monk
 Bernard of Kilwinning (d. c. 1331), Scottish abbot and chancellor
 Bernard of Quintavalle (died 1241), companion of St. Francis of Assisi
 Bernard of Verdun, author of the Tractatus super totam astrologiam

Modern
 Bernard (footballer) (Bernard Anício Caldeira Duarte), Brazilian footballer
 Bernard Aluwihare (1902–1961), Sri Lankan politician
 Bernard Alvarez, NASCAR racing driver
 Bernard Anício Caldeira Duarte, known as "Bernard", Brazilian footballer
 Bernard Baruch (1870–1965), American financier and political adviser
 Bernard Berrian (born 1980), American football player
 Bernard Blaut (1940–2007), Polish football player
 Bernard Bonnejean (born 1950), French author
 Bernard Boursicot (born 1944), on whom the play M. Butterfly was based
 Bernard Butler (born 1970), English musician
 Bernard Caprasse (born 1949), Belgian politician
 Bernard Cerquiglini (born 1947), French linguist
 Bernard Cottret (1951–2020), French historian
 Bernard Coyne (giant) (1897–1921), American who is one of only 20 individuals in medical history to have stood 8 feet (240 cm) or more
 Bernard Cribbins (1928–2022), English children's TV personality, actor and voice artist
 Bernard Dowiyogo (1946–2003), President of Nauru
 Bernard Ebbers (1941–2020), engineered an accounting fraud at WorldCom while he was its CEO
 Bernie Ecclestone (born 1930), British business magnate and primary authority in Formula One
 Bernard Edwards (American football) (born 1969), American football player
 Bernard Fanning (born 1969), Australian singer, Powderfinger
 Bernard Finnigan (born 1972), Australian politician and sex offender
 Bernard T. Feld (1919–1993), 20th century physicist and anti-nuclear activist
 Bernard Fox (Irish republican) (born 1951), Provisional Irish Republican Army member
 Bernard Freeman, birth name of American rapper Bun B
 Bernard Freyberg, New Zealand's most famous soldier and General of World War II
 Bernard Guignedoux (1947–2021), French football player
 Bernard Hall (disambiguation), multiple people
 Bernard Henry (born 1960), American football player
 Bernard Herrmann (1911–1975), American film composer
 Bernard Hill (born 1944), English actor
 Bernard Hinault (born 1954), French cyclist, five-time winner of the Tour de France
 Bernard Hopkins (born 1965), boxer
 Bernard Jayamanna (1908-1965), Sri Lankan Sinhala playwright, director, producer, actor
 Bernard Jayasuriya, Sri Lankan businessman and politician
 Bernard Kalb (1922–2023), American broadcast journalist
 Bernard Koura (1923–2018), French painter
 Bernard Ładysz (1922–2020), Polish singer and actor
 Bernard Lagat (born 1974), Kenyan-American distance runner
 Bernard Lee (1908–1981), English actor
 Bernard Lepkofker, American competitive judoka 
 Bernard Looney (born 1969/1970), Irish businessman, CEO of BP
 Bernie Mac (born Bernard McCullough, 1957–2008), comedian and actor
 Bernard Madoff (1938-2021), American stockbroker who engineered a $65 billion Ponzi scheme
 Bernard Malamud (1914–1986), American writer
 Bernard Manning (1930–2007), British stand-up comedian
 Bernard Matthews, English turkey farmer, founder of Bernard Matthews Limited
 Bernard McGinley, American judge
 Bernard Ménétrel (1906–1947), French physician and advisor to Marshal Philippe Pétain during World War II
 Bernard Mohlalisi (1933–2020), Mosotho Roman Catholic bishop
 Bernard Montgomery (1887–1976), English military officer
 Bernard Opper (1915–2000), American basketball player
 Bernard Peiris (1908–1977), Sri Lankan lawyer
 Bernard Perera (1956–2012), Sri Lankan cricketer
 Bernard Rajzman (born 1957), Brazilian volleyball player
 Bernard H. "Johnny" Rogers (1905–1977), American politician
 Bernard Sachs (1858–1944), American neurologist
 Bernie Sanders (born 1941), US Senator from Vermont
 Bernard Satenstein (1906–1959), American football player
 Bernard Schuiteman (born 1973), Dutch football player
 George Bernard Shaw (1856–1950), usually referred to as "Bernard Shaw", Irish playwright, critic, and essayist
 Bernard Shaw (1940–2022), American broadcast journalist
 Bernard Shir-Cliff (1924-2017), American editor 
 Bernard Spilsbury (1877–1947), English pathologist
 Bernard Soysa (1914–1997), Sri Lankan Trotskyist
 Bernard Sumner (born 1956), British musician
 Bernard Tapie (1943–2021), French businessman and politician
 Bernie Taupin (born 1950), British songwriter and collaborator with Elton John
 Bernard Tilakaratna (1927–2004), Sri Lankan diplomat
 Bernard Tomic (born 1992), Australian tennis player
 Bernard Vogler (1935–2020), French historian and academic
 Bernard "Bernie" Wolfe (born 1951), Canadian hockey player
 Bernard Wolfman (1924–2011), American dean of the University of Pennsylvania Law School, and law professor
Bernard Zehrfuss (1911–1996), French architect
Bernard Welsh (1959)

Surname
 Agnes Bernard (1842–1932), British Roman Catholic nun
 Alain Bernard (born 1983), French swimmer
 Alfred Aloysous Bernard (1888–1949) American vaudeville singer
 Antoine Bernard d'Attanoux (1853–1954), French journalist and explorer
 Armand Bernard (1893–1968), French comic actor and composer
 Brandon Bernard (1980–2020), American convicted murderer
 Carlos Bernard (born 1962), American actor
 Catherine Bernard (1662–1712), French novelist
 Cheryl Bernard (born 1966), Canadian curler
 Claude Bernard (1813–1878), French physiologist
 Crystal Bernard (born 1961), American actress
 Daniel Bernard (disambiguation), multiple people
 Dave Bernard (American football) (1912–1973), American football player
 David Bernard (cricketer) (born 1981), West Indian cricketer
 David Bernard (orchestra conductor) (born 1964), American conductor, pianist and clarinetist
 Dwight Bernard (born 1952), American baseball player
 Ed Bernard (born 1939), American actor
 Edward Bernard (1638–1697), English scholar
 Émile Bernard (composer) (1843–1902), French composer and organist
 Émile Bernard (painter) (1868–1941), French painter
 Francis Bernard (disambiguation), multiple people
 Giovani Bernard, American football player
 Henri Bernard (1899–1986), French judge
 Henri Bernard (1900–1967), French hurdler
 Henry Boyle Bernard (1812–1895), Irish Conservative Party politician, MP for Bandon 1863–68
 Henry Bernard, designer of the Palace of Europe, the seat of the Council of Europe
 Hilda Bernard (1920–2022), Argentine actress
 Jacques Bernard (born 1929), French actor
 Jay Bernard FRSL (born 1988), British writer.
 Jean-David Bernard (born 1977), French rower
 Jean-Pierre Bernard (1933–2017), French actor
 Jeffrey Bernard (1932–1997), English journalist
 John Henry Bernard (1860–1927) Church of Ireland Archbishop of Dublin
 Joseph E. Bernard (1880–1958), American character actor 
 Joseph Karl Bernard (c.1781–1850), Austrian journalist and librettist
 Jules Bernard (born 2000), American basketball player
 Laurent Bernard (born 1971), French basketball player
 Lawrence G. Bernard (1914-1997), rear admiral in the U.S. Navy
 Léonce Bernard (1943–2013), Canadian politician
 Lucas M. Bernard, American financial economist
 Marvin Bernard, American rapper, better known by his stage name Tony Yayo
 Michel Bernard (disambiguation), multiple people
 Nikhil Bernard, Indian footballer
 Oliver Bernard (1925–2013), English poet and translator
 Oliver Percy Bernard (1881–1939), English architect and scenic designer
 Raymond Bernard (1891–1977), French film director and screenwriter
 Raymond W. Bernard (1903–1965), early 20th-century American alternative health, esoteric writer, author, and mystic
 Rod Bernard (1940–2020), American singer
 Samuel Bernard (1615–1687), French miniature painter
 Sherman A. Bernard (1925–2012), Louisiana politician
 Susan Bernard (1948–2019), American actress and author
 Suzanne Bernard (1892–1910), French aviator
 Terrel Bernard (born 1999), American football player
 Tristan Bernard (1866–1947), French playwright and novelist
 Valère Bernard (1860–1936), French artist and writer
 William Bernard (disambiguation), multiple people
 Wynton Bernard (born 1990), American baseball player

Fictional characters

Given name
 Bernard (TV shorts), the curious polar bear from the animation series Bernard
 Bernard, a character from Blackadder II, who is usually only called by her title: Nursie
 Bernard, a character from Megamind
 Bernard, a character from The Waves
 Bernard, a mouse from The Rescuers books and films
 Bernard, the Sea Hag's pet vulture in the Popeye comics/cartoons
 Bernarda Alba, the mother in Federico García Lorca's drama, La casa de Bernarda Alba
 Bernard Beasley, a character from the children's programme Bernard's Watch
 Bernard Bernoulli, a character from Maniac Mansion
 Bernard Black, a character from Black Books
 Bernard "Barney" Fife, deputy sheriff of Mayberry from The Andy Griffith Show
 Bernard Lowe, a character from Westworld
 Bernard Marx from Brave New World
 Bernard Nadler, a character from the television show Lost
 Bernard the Arch-elf, The Head elf from Disney's Santa Clause Movies
 Bernard the Bee Boy, a boy raised by bees seen in two commercials for Honey Comb cereal
 Bernard Wiseman, a character from Mobile Suit Gundam 0080: War in the Pocket
 Bernard Woolley, a character from Yes Minister
 Bernard Mickey Wrangle, an explosive character from Still Life with Woodpecker by Tom Robbins
 Bernardo, Zorro's companion
 Giant Bernard, wrestling name of Matt Bloom
 Bernie Lomax The Boss who dies in the 80's comedy film Weekend at Bernie's

Surname
 Andy Bernard, character on the United States television series The Office

See also
 
 
 Barnard (disambiguation)
 Barney (disambiguation)
 Bernat (disambiguation)
 Bernhard (disambiguation)
 Grand Rivers, Kentucky, United States, formerly known as Bernard
 Saint Bernard (disambiguation)

References 

French masculine given names
French-language surnames
English masculine given names
Patronymic surnames
Surnames from given names